Gramenet is a hamlet located in the municipality of Isona i Conca Dellà, in Province of Lleida province, Catalonia, Spain. As of 2020, it has a population of 1.

Geography 
Gramenet is located 90km northeast of Lleida.

References

Populated places in the Province of Lleida